Grapevine leafroll-associated virus 2 (GRLaV2) is a virus infecting grapevine in the genus Closterovirus. It is associated with rugose wood condition of grapevine.According to Bosciai, 1995, grapevine corky bark-associated virus (GCBaV) is a variant of GRLaV2.

See also 
 List of viruses

References

External links 
 uniprot.org/taxonomy

Closteroviridae
Viral grape diseases